Park Hyun-yong (Korean: 박현용; born April 6, 1964 South Korea) is a South Korean former footballer who played as a defender.

He started professional career at Daewoo Royals in 1987.

He was winner of K League Best XI in 1991 K League.

References

External links 
 

1964 births
Living people
Association football defenders
Busan IPark players
South Korean footballers
Ajou University alumni